David Firisua (born July 12, 1981) is a former Solomon Islands professional footballer. He is currently team manager for Auckland City FC.

Career
Firisua began his professional career with Laugu FC United in the Solomon Islands and joined in the winter of 2003 New Zealand club Central United.

Clubs
 Laugu FC United 2002
 Central United 2003–?

International career
He was also a member of Solomon Islands national football team from 2001.

References

1981 births
Living people
Association football defenders
Solomon Islands expatriate footballers
Solomon Islands footballers
Solomon Islands international footballers
Expatriate association footballers in New Zealand
Solomon Islands expatriate sportspeople in New Zealand
2000 OFC Nations Cup players
2002 OFC Nations Cup players